Bruceton is an unincorporated suburb of Pittsburgh within Allegheny County, Pennsylvania, United States. It is part of the Greater Pittsburgh metropolitan region. Its western half is part of South Park Township and its eastern half is part of Jefferson Hills.

Bruceton is the home of the Experimental Mine of the U.S. Bureau of Mines, which originally opened in 1910. It is also the home of the Pittsburgh Safety and Health Technology Center. The Pittsburgh and West Virginia Railway connected to the B&O Railroad in Bruceton. It is 185 miles (or 298 km) northwest of Washington D.C.

History
In the early 1940s, the town hosted almost 100 scientists to help develop the Manhattan Project as a laboratory of the National Defense Research Committee including a month-long visit by Linus Pauling.

See also 
Bruceton analysis
Experimental Mine, U.S. Bureau of Mines
George Kistiakowsky
National Energy Technology Laboratory
RDX

References 

Unincorporated communities in Allegheny County, Pennsylvania
Unincorporated communities in Pennsylvania